Catlyn is a surname. Notable people with the surname include:

 Richard Catlyn (by 1520–1556), English politician
 Robert Catlyn (died 1574), English judge
 William Catlyn (1628–1709), English architect